Sir Thomas McIlwraith  (17 May 1835 – 17 July 1900) was for many years the dominant figure of colonial politics in Queensland. He was Premier of Queensland from 1879 to 1883, again in 1888, and for a third time in 1893. In common with most politicians of his era, McIlwraith was an influential businessman, who combined his parliamentary career with a prosperous involvement in the pastoral industry.

Early life
Thomas McIlwraith was born in Ayr, Scotland, in 1835, one of four sons of John McIlwraith, plumber and shipowner, and his wife Janet Hamilton née Howat. His eldest brother, John (1828–1902), migrated to Victoria, Australia, in 1853; his youngest brother, Andrew (1844–1932), co-founded McIlwraith, McEacharn & Co in London with Malcolm McEacharn.

McIlwraith studied civil engineering at the University of Glasgow.

Australia
McIlwraith's brother John's success in Melbourne persuaded him, in 1854, to migrate to Victoria where he worked as a surveyor and engineer for the Department of Railways, and subsequently as a partner with Messrs Cornish and Bruce, railway contractors. He also invested in eight pastoral holdings in the Maranoa district in Queensland.

He retained close relations with his brother John, and on 6 June 1863 married Margaret Whannell, sister of John's wife. They had three daughters, Jessie (b. 1866), Mary (b. 1868) and Blanche (b. 1872). He eventually moved to Queensland, but Margaret was reluctant to live in isolated Merivale station. In 1871 she visited Merivale, but soon returned to Melbourne for Blanche's birth. In 1874 they decided to live in Brisbane. Thomas found that she was drinking heavily, and sent her to Scotland where she died in 1877. McIlwraith fathered an illegitimate daughter in Victoria. In 1877 McIlwraith was a founding partner of the North Australian Pastoral Company. In 1879 he married Harriette Ann née Mosman. Harriette was the sister of Hugh Mosman, who discovered gold in Charters Towers, and Cecilia Mosman, wife of his political colleague Arthur Palmer (also Premier of Queensland); she gave birth to his fourth legitimate daughter in 1881.

Parliamentary career
While working for J V A Bruce, he represented his employers in a dispute with the Victorian government, and attracted public attention. In 1864 he contested the Sandhurst seat in the Victorian Legislative Assembly but won few votes as a free trader.

McIlwraith was elected to the Legislative Assembly in the seat of Maranoa in 1868.

He joined the ministry of Arthur Macalister in January 1874 becoming Secretary for Public Works and Mines. He resigned from these posts in October of that year.

The government of John Douglas was defeated in 1879 after a series of severe droughts and McIlwraith became premier for the first time. He quickly worked to ameliorate the colony's finances and with the assistance of a return of agricultural prosperity he turned the budget deficit into a surplus. Queensland at this stage was seeing increasing numbers of immigrants and McIlwraith oversaw the colony's economic development. The McIlwraith government introduced the divisional system of local government to the larger part of Queensland and assisted in establishing a postal service through the Torres Strait Islands. In 1882 he was knighted.

The Australian colonies were extremely anxious about German colonial activities in the region, it became clear that the German government was planning to annex eastern New Guinea, to Queensland's north. McIlwraith took the extraordinary step of attempting to annex New Guinea for Queensland; he employed Henry Chester to proclaim the Queen's sovereignty which occurred on 4 April 1883. This was later disallowed by the British Secretary of State for the Colonies, Lord Derby on the basis that a colonial government had no authority to annex other colonies. Indignation at this apparent slight to colonial prerogatives incited the gathering of an Intercolonial Convention in November and December 1883, with federation and annexation on its agenda. This proved to be a first step in the federation movement, and more quickly resulted in the establishment in 1884 of the Federal Council of Australasia. Orders were eventually given to establish British New Guinea as a protectorate on the southern coast of the eastern coast of New Guinea on 6 November 1884. However, a well-informed German Navy had secretly landed, annexing the northern coast under the name ‘Kaiser-Wilhelmsland’ three days earlier. News about German New Guinea was successfully kept a secret until it finally broke on 22 December that year. The following day an irate McIlwraith told the Queensland parliament that British conduct in this affair constituted "the grossest piece of treachery on the part of the English government to the colonies that has ever been perpetrated".

In 1883 a government proposal to raise funds for the construction of a transcontinental railway line by a system of land grants was attacked for corruption in allocation of grants. McIlwraith lost office to his rival, Samuel Griffith, in November and retired from politics in 1886.

McIlwraith returned to stand for Parliament in 1888, this time as member for North Brisbane. His "National Australia Party" won a majority in the elections and he again became Premier and Treasurer. He came into conflict with the colony's Governor, Sir Anthony Musgrave over the exercise of the royal pardon. Musgrave died in October and McIlwraith petitioned the new Colonial Secretary Lord Knutsford, to allow the Queensland government to be consulted on the choice of governor. Knutsford refused and appointed Sir Harry Blake. The local legislature problematically declined to ratify the appointment, but henceforth it was understood that the colonies would be consulted in vice-regal appoinyments. In November of that year ill-health forced McIlwraith to resign in favour of Boyd Dunlop Morehead, whereupon he travelled to China and Japan.

After his return McIlwraith's relationship with his colleagues deteriorated, and in August 1890 he formed an alliance (later known as the "Continuous Ministry") with his erstwhile foe to become Treasurer in the government of Sir Samuel Griffith. In March 1893 Griffith stepped down to join the Supreme Court of Queensland and McIlwraith became Premier again. His health was still poor and in October he resigned in favour of Hugh Nelson, contenting himself with the cabinet position of Chief Secretary and secretary for railways until 29 March 1895.

The Dictionary of Australian of Biography says:

McIlwraith was a big man with big ideas, but his indifferent health did not allow him to successfully carry the full burden of them. He was rugged and masterful, possibly on occasions not over-scrupulous, with a habit of getting his own way by sheer force of character rather than by intellectual ability. For nearly 25 years he was one of the greatest personalities in Queensland.

After politics
Since 1888 the London directors of McIlwraith's Queensland Investment and Land Mortgage Co. had complained about the practices of the local board, and in 1892 they charged McIlwraith, Palmer and two others with fraud. The remaining years of his life were surrounded in financial scandal and large financial losses by institutions that he was involved with.

Although McIlwraith left for England on 15 January 1895, he was still a minister of the Queensland cabinet until 25 November 1897 when the Labor Party with government support succeeded in passing a resolution that he should retire. On 9 December he resigned from the Executive Council.

McIlwraith's aspirations for political integration of the Australian colonies centred on the Federal Council of Australasia, and he actively sought the entry of New South Wales into this body. In the 1899 referendum on the creation of a Commonwealth of Australia he urged Queenslanders to vote No to placing Queensland in the "hands of men unacquainted with the past, and who cannot in full share our hopes for the future".

McIlwraith died in London on 17 July 1900 and was buried at Ayr.

Named in his honour
The following places were named after him:
 McIlwraith, Queensland, a locality in the Bundaberg Region
 McIlwraith Range, Queensland, a mountain range in the Cook Shire

See also
 Members of the Queensland Legislative Assembly, 1868–1870; 1870–1871; 1873–1878; 1878–1883; 1883–1888; 1888–1893; 1893–1896

Notes

References
 Joyce R. B. & Murphy, D. J. (Ed.): Queensland Political Portraits, St Lucia (University of Queensland Press), 1978.

Further reading

External links

Premiers of Queensland
Members of the Queensland Legislative Assembly
1835 births
1900 deaths
Knights Commander of the Order of St Michael and St George
People from South Ayrshire
Treasurers of Queensland
Scottish emigrants to colonial Australia
Alumni of the University of Glasgow
19th-century Australian politicians
Mosman family